Cima minima is a species of gastropods belonging to the family Cimidae. Their shell is 1.5 mm in height.

The species is found in Southern Europe. They have no eyes. They are hermaphrodites. Due to their small size, they do not have a heart, an osphradium or a ctenidium.

References

Cimidae
Gastropods described in 1858
Gastropods of Europe